Hydrostachys is a genus of about 22 species of flowering plants native to Madagascar and southern and central Africa. It is the only genus in the family Hydrostachyaceae. All species of Hydrostachys are aquatic, growing on rocks in fast-moving water. They have tuberous roots, usually pinnately compound leaves, and highly reduced flowers on dense spikes.

Phylogenetic placement of Hydrostachys is particularly problematic. Due to its specialized aquatic morphology, it has often been grouped with other aquatic plants, such as the family Podostemaceae. However, embryological, floral, and other morphological characters do not support this placement, and molecular data suggest that Hydrostachys is related to taxa in the order Cornales. Its position in Cornales is uncertain; it may be basal to the rest of the order, or fall within the family Hydrangeaceae. It shares few morphological similarities with other Cornales.

Species
(This list may be incomplete.)

 Hydrostachys decaryi
 Hydrostachys distichophylla
 Hydrostachys fimbriata
 Hydrostachys imbricata
 Hydrostachys laciniata
 Hydrostachys longifida
 Hydrostachys maxima
 Hydrostachys monoica
 Hydrostachys multifida
 Hydrostachys perrieri
 Hydrostachys plumosa
 Hydrostachys stolonifera
 Hydrostachys trifaria
 Hydrostachys verruculosa

References

External links
 Hydrostachys on eFloras.org

Hydrostachyaceae
Cornales genera